Larry Chatmon Little (born November 2, 1945) is an American former professional football player who was an offensive guard in the National Football League (NFL). He played college football at Bethune–Cookman University in Daytona Beach, Florida. He signed with the San Diego Chargers as an undrafted free agent in 1967. After two years in San Diego, he was then traded to the Miami Dolphins where he played for the rest of his career, establishing himself as one of the best offensive guards in the NFL.

Little was a five-time Pro Bowl selection, and a seven-time first- or second-team all-pro. He was part of a dominant Miami Dolphins offensive line which included Hall of Fame center Jim Langer and opposite offensive guard Bob Kuechenberg, that was instrumental in the Miami Dolphins winning Super Bowl VII during their perfect season in 1972, and Super Bowl VIII the following year. He was elected to the NFL 1970s All-Decade Team, a member of the Miami Dolphins Honor Roll, and was elected to the Pro Football Hall of Fame in 1993.

College career
Little played for the Bethune–Cookman Wildcats from 1964 to 1967 on the team's offensive and defensive line. He was a three-time All-]Southern Intercollegiate Athletic Conference (SIAC) selection.

Professional career

Little went undrafted in 1967.  After the draft, he received free agent offers from Miami, San Diego, and Baltimore.   He signed as a free agent with the American Football League's San Diego Chargers because they offered him the largest signing bonus ($750).  After playing for San Diego in 1967 and 1968, he was traded to the AFL's Miami Dolphins for the 1969 season, when he was named an AFL All-Star. He then played with the National Football League Dolphins from 1970 through 1980.

"I didn't particularly like the trade," Little said in the January 1974 issue of SPORT. "The Dolphins weren't much then."

Little was a key contributor to the success of the Dolphins' punishing running attack of the early and mid-1970s, which featured Larry Csonka, Mercury Morris, and Jim Kiick.

Post-playing career
He also served as head football coach of his alma mater, from 1983 to 1991, and as head coach at North Carolina Central University from 1993 to 1998.
In addition, Little served as head coach of the Ohio Glory of the World League of American Football (which eventually became the now-defunct NFL Europe).

On December 16, 1993, Larry was added to the Miami Dolphins Honor Roll.

In 1999, he was ranked number 79 on The Sporting News' list of the 100 Greatest Football Players.

Personal life
Little's younger brother, David Little, was a linebacker for the Pittsburgh Steelers.

In 2007 was named to the Florida High School Association All-Century Team which selected the Top 33 players in the 100-year history of high school football in the state of Florida's history.

Head coaching record

College

See also
 List of American Football League players

References

External links
 
 

1945 births
Living people
American football offensive guards
American Football League players
Bethune–Cookman Wildcats football coaches
Bethune–Cookman Wildcats football players
Miami Dolphins players
North Carolina Central Eagles football coaches
Ohio Glory coaches
San Diego Chargers players
American Football League All-Star players
American Conference Pro Bowl players
Pro Football Hall of Fame inductees
Booker T. Washington Senior High School (Miami, Florida) alumni
Sports coaches from Miami
Coaches of American football from Florida
Players of American football from Miami
African-American coaches of American football
African-American players of American football
20th-century African-American sportspeople
21st-century African-American sportspeople